Haberlandia is a genus of moths in the family Metarbelidae.

Species

Etymology
The genus is named in honour of the grandparents of the author, Eduard Willi Haberland and his wife Charlotte Marie Johanna, née Quitter, who died on 26 December 2010.

References

 , 2011: The description of a new genus and twenty-three new species of Metarbelidae (Lepidoptera:Cossoidea) from the lowland tropical rain forests of the Guineo-Congolian Region with notes on habitats and biogeography. Published by the author. Hamburg, 67 pages, 10 b/w plates, 6 colour plates, 1 coloured map: 1-67. Full article:

External links
Natural History Museum Lepidoptera generic names catalog

Metarbelinae